The Bermuda Triangle (also known as The Secrets of the Bermuda Triangle and Devil's Triangle of Bermuda) is a 1978 Mexican-Italian science fiction horror film written and directed by René Cardona Jr.

Plot
The boat Black Whale III sails into the Bermuda Triangle with the Marvin family aboard, intending to search for the remains of Atlantis. Along the way, they discover a doll floating in the water, which Diana Marvin—the family's youngest daughter—takes as her own. Diana appears to become possessed by the doll, and starts saying that everyone will die, and telling people the order they will die in. She also locks the ship's cook in the freezer, who almost dies before he is freed. One night, the boat follows a Fresnel lens signaling an SOS even though nothing appears on the radar. They abandon the search after the signal identifies itself as a ship that was lost years ago.

The Black Whale III reaches its destination, and the crew begins a scuba exploration of some underwater ruins. A submarine earthquake disturbs the ruins and crushes the legs of Michelle Marvin, the family's eldest daughter. The ship attempts to head for the nearby island of Bimini for help, but they become stuck in a storm, hit some rocks, and have their engines and helm damaged. The ship's cook dies in an apparent accident during the storm, and Diana's parents are swept overboard looking for her. The next day, the engineer dies trying to repair the helm when Diana turns on the engines while he is inspecting the propellers. With the ship stranded and Michelle in desperate need of medical attention, the ship's mate and Michelle's brother depart the ship with her in a motorboat to try to reach Bimini. Michelle perishes on the voyage, and the boat becomes lost and never reaches its destination. Diana's aunt and uncle perish next, apparently killed by the doll.

Back on Black Whale III, the captain attempts to signal for help. They hear distress calls from other ships, including their own being repeated. Finally, they are able to contact Bimini and relate their situation. At Bimini, the radar operator says that their story is implausible, for the Black Whale III disappeared about twelve years ago with a family named Marvin aboard. The ship disappears, and the doll is left floating in the water.

Cast
 John Huston as Edward
 Gloria Guida as Michelle
 Marina Vlady as Kim
 Hugo Stiglitz as Mark Briggs 
 Carlos East as Peter
 Claudine Auger as Sybill
 Al Coster as Dave
 Andrés García as Alan
 Gretha as Diana
Miguel Angel Fuentes as Gordon

Production
Parts of the film were shot in Park City, Utah.

References

External links

The Bermuda Triangle on the Internet Archive

1978 films
1978 horror films
1970s science fiction horror films
Mexican science fiction horror films
Italian science fiction horror films
English-language Mexican films
English-language Italian films
Films set in the Bermuda Triangle
Films shot in Utah
Films scored by Stelvio Cipriani
Films based on non-fiction books
1970s English-language films
1970s Mexican films
1970s Italian films